Bhaben Baruah is an Asom Gana Parishad politician from Assam. He was elected in Assam Legislative Assembly election in 1985 and 1996 from Chabua.

References 

Living people
Asom Gana Parishad politicians
Assam MLAs 1985–1991
Assam MLAs 1996–2001
People from Lakhimpur district
Year of birth missing (living people)